Dienstina is a trilobite in the order Phacopida, that existed during the lower Devonian in what is now Germany. It was described by Richter and Richter in 1931, and the type species is Dienstina diensti, which the authors had originally assigned to the genus Phacopidella in 1923. The type locality was in Oberscheld, Rhenish Massif.

References

External links
 Dienstina at the Paleobiology Database

Phacopidae
Fossil taxa described in 1931
Devonian trilobites of Europe
Fossils of Germany
Paleozoic life of the Northwest Territories